The 1986 World Juniors Track Cycling Championships were the 12th annual Junior World Championships for track cycling held in Casablanca, Morocco in August 1986.

The Championships had five events for men only: Sprint, Points race, Individual pursuit, Team pursuit and 1 kilometre time trial.

Events

Medal table

References

UCI Juniors Track World Championships
1986 in track cycling
1986 in Moroccan sport